Ewe (Eʋe or Eʋegbe ) is a language spoken by approximately 20 million people in West Africa, mainly in Ghana, Togo and Benin, and also in some other countries like Liberia and southwestern Nigeria. Ewe is part of a cluster of related languages commonly called the Gbe languages. The other major Gbe language is Fon, which is mainly spoken in Benin. Like many African languages, Ewe is tonal as well as a possible member of the Niger-Congo family.

The German Africanist Diedrich Hermann Westermann published many dictionaries and grammars of Ewe and several other Gbe languages. Other linguists who have worked on Ewe and closely related languages include Gilbert Ansre (tone, syntax), Herbert Stahlke (morphology, tone), Nick Clements (tone, syntax), Roberto Pazzi (anthropology, lexicography), Felix K. Ameka (semantics, cognitive linguistics), Alan Stewart Duthie (semantics, phonetics), Hounkpati B. Capo (phonology, phonetics), Enoch Aboh (syntax), and Chris Collins (syntax).

Dialects
Some of the commonly named Ewe ('Vhe') dialects are Aŋlɔ, Tɔŋu (Tɔŋgu), Avenor, Agave people, Evedome, Awlan, Gbín, Pekí, Kpándo, Vhlin, Hó, Avɛ́no, Vo, Kpelen, Vɛ́, Danyi, Agu, Fodome, Wancé, Wací, Adángbe (Capo).

Ethnologue 16 considers Waci and Kpesi (Kpessi) to be distinct enough to be considered separate languages. They form a dialect continuum with Ewe and Gen (Mina), which share a mutual intelligibility level of 85%; the Ewe varieties Gbin, Ho, Kpelen, Kpesi, and Vhlin might be considered a third cluster of Western Gbe dialects between Ewe and Gen, but Kpesi is as close or closer to the Waci and Vo dialects, which remain in Ewe in that scenario. Waci intervenes geographically between Ewe proper and Gen; Kpesi forms a Gbe island in the Kabye area.

Ewe is itself a dialect cluster of the Gbe languages, which include Gen, Aja, and Xwla and are spoken from the southern part of Ghana to Togo, Benin and Western Nigeria. All Gbe languages share at least some intelligibility with one another. Some coastal and southern dialects of Ewe include Aŋlɔ, Tongu (Tɔŋu), Avenor, Dzodze, and Watsyi. Some inland dialects indigenously characterized as Ewedomegbe include: Ho, Kpedze, Hohoe, Peki, Kpando, Aveme, Liati,  Fódome, Danyi, and Kpele. Though there are many classifications, distinct variations exist between towns that are just miles away from one another.

Phonology

Consonants

H is a voiced fricative, which has also been described as uvular, pharyngeal, or glottal .

The nasal consonants  are not distinctive since they appear before only nasal vowels; therefore, Ewe is sometimes said to have no nasal consonants. However, it is more economical to argue that nasal  are the underlying form and so are denasalized before oral vowels.

 occurs before unrounded (non-back) vowels and  before rounded (back) vowels.

Ewe is one of the few languages known to contrast  vs.  and  vs. .

 may occur in consonant clusters. It becomes  (or ) after coronals.

Vowels

The tilde (˜) marks nasal vowels, though the Peki dialect lacks .

Ewe does not have a nasal–oral contrast in consonants. Some authors treat it as a vowel, with the odd result that Ewe would have more nasal than oral vowels, and one of these vowels has no set place of articulation. If it is taken to be a consonant, there is the odd result of a single nasal consonant that cannot appear before vowels. If nasal consonants are taken to underlie , however, there is no such odd restriction, and the only difference from other consonants is that only nasal stops may be syllabic, a common pattern cross-linguistically.

Tones
Ewe is a tonal language.  In a tonal language, pitch differences are used to distinguish one word from another.  For example, in Ewe the following three words differ only by tone:

 tó  'mountain' (High tone)
 tǒ  'mortar'   (Rising tone)
 tò  'buffalo'  (Low tone)

Phonetically, there are three tone registers, High, Mid, and Low, and three rising and falling contour tones. However, most Ewe dialects have only two distinctive registers, High and Mid. These are depressed in nouns after voiced obstruents: High becomes Mid (or Rising), and Mid becomes Low. Mid is also realized as Low at the end of a phrase or utterance, as in the example 'buffalo' above.

In writing, tones are marked by acute accent, grave accent, caron, and circumflex. They may be used along with the tilde that marks nasal vowels.

Pragmatics
Ewe has phrases of overt politeness, such as meɖekuku (meaning "please") and akpe (meaning "thank you").

Orthography
The African Reference Alphabet is used when Ewe is represented orthographically, so the written version is somewhat like a combination of the Latin alphabet and the International Phonetic Alphabet.

An "n" is placed after vowels to mark nasalization. Tone is generally unmarked, except in some common cases, which require disambiguation: the first person plural pronoun mí 'we' is marked high to distinguish it from the second person plural mi 'you', and the second person singular pronoun wò 'you' is marked low to distinguish it from the third person plural pronoun wó 'they/them'
 ekpɔ wò  — 'he saw you'
 ekpɔ wo  — 'he saw them'

Naming system
The Ewe use a system of giving the first name to a child, based on the day of the week that the child was born. That arises from a belief that the real name of a child can be determined only after the child has shown its character. However, as a child is a person, not an object, the child must be referred to by some name in the interim and so a name is provided based on the day of birth. A final name is given at a naming ceremony, seven days after the date of birth.

As a matter of pride in their heritage, especially since the 1970s, many educated Ewe, who were given Western names, have dropped those names formally/legally or informally and use their birthday name as their official name.

The Ewe birthday-naming system is as follows:

Often, people are called by their birthday name most of the time; the given name being used only on formal documents. In such cases, children with the same birth name are delineated by suffixes: -gã meaning big, -vi meaning little. So for example, after the birth of another Kofi, the first child called Kofi becomes Kofigã, and the new child Kofi. A subsequent Kofi, would be Kofivi, or Kofitse, mostly among Wedome and Tɔngu Ewes. Sometimes, the renaming happens twice, as the second Kofi might have originally been called Kofivi, while the eldest retained Kofi, thereby necessitating that they both be renamed on the birth of a third Kofi.

Grammar

Ewe is a subject–verb–object language. The possessive precedes the head noun. Adjectives, numerals, demonstratives and relative clauses follow the head noun. Ewe also has postpositions rather than prepositions.

Ewe is well known as a language having logophoric pronouns.  Such pronouns are used to refer to the source of a reported statement or thought in indirect discourse, and can disambiguate sentences that are ambiguous in most other languages. The following examples illustrate:

 Kofi be e-dzo  'Kofi said he left' (he ≠ Kofi)
 Kofi be yè-dzo 'Kofi said he left' (he = Kofi)

In the second sentence, yè is the logophoric pronoun.

Ewe also has a rich system of serial verb constructions.

Status

Ewe is a national language in Togo and Ghana.

Citations

General sources 
 Ansre, Gilbert (1961) The Tonal Structure of Ewe. MA thesis, Kennedy School of Missions of Hartford Seminary Foundation.
 Ameka, Felix Kofi (2001). "Ewe". In Garry and Rubino (eds.), Fact About the World's Languages: An Encyclopedia of the World's Major Languages, Past and Present. New York/Dublin: The H. W. Wilson Company. pp. 207–213.
 Clements, George N. (1975). "The logophoric pronoun in Ewe: Its role in discourse". Journal of West African Languages. 10(2): 141–177.
 Collins, Chris. (1993) Topics in Ewe Syntax. Doctoral Dissertation, MIT.
 Capo, Hounkpati B. C. (1991). A Comparative Phonology of Gbe, Publications in African Languages and Linguistics, 14. Berlin/New York: Foris Publications & Garome, Bénin: Labo Gbe (Int).
 Pasch, Helma (1995). Kurzgrammatik des Ewe. Köln: Köppe.
 Westermann, Diedrich Hermann (1930). A Study of the Ewe Language. London: Oxford University Press.

External links

  Institut für Afrikanistik der Universität zu Köln
 https://web.archive.org/web/20111118234109/http://www.uni-koeln.de/phil-fak/afrikanistik/sprachen/ewe/ Ewe being taught at University of Cologne (Institute for African Studies Cologne)
 Ewe Basic Course by Irene Warburton, Prosper Kpotufe, Roland Glover, and Catherine Felten (textbook in Portable Digital Format and audio files in MP3 format) at Indiana University Bloomington's Center for Language Technology and Instructional Enrichment (CELTIE).
 Articles on Ewe (Journal of West African Languages)
 The Ewe language at Verba Africana
 Ewe alphabet and pronunciation page at Omniglot
 Free virtual keyboard for Ewe language at GhanaKeyboards.Com
  Recordings of Ewe being spoken.
 My First Gbe Dictionary Online Gbe(Ewe)-English Glossary
 PanAfriL10n page
 Ewe IPA
 Ewe online grammar; in French. Apparently the text of Grammaire ev̳e: aide-mémoire des règles d'orthographe de l'ev̳e by Kofi J. Adzomada, 1980.
 Biblia Le Internet Dzi; online bible in Ewe language by Jehovah's Witnesses
 Ewe Bible (Èʋegbe Biblia) Nublabla Xoxo and Yeye 

Ewe people
Gbe languages
Languages of Ghana
Languages of Togo
Subject–verb–object languages